The Glenorchy Ice Skating Rink is an ice sports and public skating centre built in 1980 and located in Glenorchy, Tasmania, Australia. It is the only ice rink in the state and serves as the home of Ice Hockey Tasmania and FSAT.

Facilities

Facilities at Glenorchy Ice Rink are detailed below:
  ice rink
 100 capacity for spectators
 Skate Hire (sizes from tiny 5 up to adult 14)
 Lockers for hire 
 Skating aids
 Party rooms
 Cafe
 Male and female toilets

Events

Glenorchy Ice Rink hosts regular events including general public skating sessions, Friday night skating discos, figure skating (public, semi-public and private sessions), ice hockey (3 on 3 hockey including the Van Diemen's League and Ice Breakers development program) and an annual ice hockey charity exhibition event hosted by Ice Skating Tasmania and Ice Hockey Tasmania. The event is in honour of former local ice hockey player Aaron Burns, who died from Leukaemia. All money raised goes towards junior ice hockey training and promotion of ice hockey in Tasmania.

See also
List of ice rinks in Australia
 Sport in Tasmania

References

External links
 Ice Skating Tasmania

Sports venues in Hobart
Ice hockey venues in Australia
Indoor arenas in Australia
Glenorchy, Tasmania
2022 disestablishments in Australia